Margarita Shirokova is a Russian football goalkeeper, currently playing for Ryazan in the Russian Championship.

As an Under-19 international she played the 2011 U-19 European Championship.

References

1991 births
Living people
Russian women's footballers
FC Zorky Krasnogorsk (women) players
WFC Rossiyanka players
Women's association football goalkeepers
Ryazan-VDV players
Russian Women's Football Championship players